Dame Penelope Anne Constance Keith,  (née Hatfield; born 2 April 1940) is an English actress and presenter, active in film, radio, stage and television and primarily known for her roles in the British sitcoms The Good Life and To the Manor Born. She succeeded Lord Olivier as president of the Actors' Benevolent Fund after his death in 1989, and was appointed Dame Commander of the Order of the British Empire (DBE) in the 2014 New Year Honours for services to the arts and to charity.

Keith joined the Royal Shakespeare Company in 1963, and went on to win the 1976 Olivier Award for Best Comedy Performance for the play Donkeys' Years. She became a household name in the UK playing Margo Leadbetter in the sitcom The Good Life (1975–78), winning the 1977 BAFTA TV Award for Best Light Entertainment Performance.

In 1978, Keith won the BAFTA TV Award for Best Actress for The Norman Conquests. She then starred as Audrey fforbes-Hamilton in the sitcom To the Manor Born (1979–81), a show that received audiences of more than 20 million. She went on to star in another six sitcoms, including Executive Stress (1986–88), No Job for a Lady (1990–92) and Next of Kin (1995–97). Since 2000, she has worked mainly in the theatre, with her roles including Madam Arcati in Blithe Spirit (2004) and Lady Bracknell in The Importance of Being Earnest (2007).

Early life
Penelope Anne Constance Hatfield was born in Sutton in 1940. Her father, an army officer who was a Major by the end of the Second World War, left her mother Connie when Keith was a baby, and she spent her early years in Clacton-on-Sea, Essex and Clapham, south London. Her great uncle, John Gurney Nutting, was a partner in the coachbuilding firm of J Gurney Nutting & Co Limited, and Keith recalls sitting in the Prince of Wales car.

Although not a Roman Catholic, at the age of six she was sent to a Catholic convent boarding school, run by French nuns, in Seaford, East Sussex, with Judy Cornwell. Here she became interested in acting, and she frequently went to matinées in the West End with her mother. When she was eight years old, her mother remarried and she adopted her stepfather's surname, Keith. While she did not get on with her stepfather, her mother was a "rock of love" to her. She was rejected by the Central School of Speech and Drama, on the grounds that, at 5'10" (1.78 m), she was too tall. However, she was then accepted at the Webber Douglas Academy of Dramatic Art and spent two years there while working at the Hyde Park Hotel in the evenings.

Keith began her career working in repertory theatre around Britain, including Lincoln, Manchester, and Salisbury. Keith's earliest appearances were in The Tunnel of Love, Gigi, and Flowering Cherry. In 1963, she joined the Royal Shakespeare Company and acted with them in Stratford and at the Aldwych Theatre in London.

Career

Early career
Keith began her television career in programmes such as The Army Game, Dixon of Dock Green, Wild, Wild Women and The Avengers. In the early 1970s, she appeared in The Morecambe & Wise Show, Ghost Story and The Pallisers. Her film appearances during this time included Every Home Should Have One, Take A Girl Like You, Rentadick and Penny Gold. In 1967, she had a minor role in Carry On Doctor, but the scene was cut from the final edit. She appeared as a nurse in A Touch of Love 1969.

Her best known theatre appearance, in 1974, was playing Sarah in The Norman Conquests, alongside Felicity Kendal, her co-star in The Good Life. Keith and Kendal would often film The Good Life during the day and perform on stage in the West End in the evening.

Television fame
Keith achieved popular fame in 1975 when the BBC sitcom The Good Life began. In the first episode, she was only heard and not seen in her role as Margo Leadbetter, but as the episodes and series went on, the scope of her role increased. In 1977, Keith won a BAFTA award for "Best Comedy Performer" for her role of Margo Leadbetter.

From 1979 to 1981, she played the lead role of Audrey fforbes-Hamilton in the TV series To the Manor Born. Following To the Manor Born, Keith has appeared in the lead role in six other sitcoms: Sweet Sixteen, Moving, Executive Stress, No Job for a Lady, Law and Disorder and Next of Kin. She also had the starring role in a TV adaptation of Agatha Christie's play Spider's Web. She won a second BAFTA award as "Best Actress" in 1978 for The Norman Conquests.

In 1982, Keith starred in a TV production of Frederick Lonsdale's On Approval. In 1988, she hosted one series of the ITV panel show What's My Line?, following the death of its former presenter, Eamonn Andrews. She had a featured role in the 1998 ITV serial Coming Home.

Work
Keith has regularly appeared on stage, taking the classics and new plays across the country. These include Shakespeare, Shaw, Sheridan, Wilde, Rattigan and Congreve. She played Lorraine in Noël Coward's Star Quality, while in 2004 she played Madame Arcati in Coward's Blithe Spirit at the Savoy Theatre. In 2004, Keith starred in the first of ten full-cast BBC radio dramatisations of M.C. Beaton's Agatha Raisin novels, playing the title role. Two years later, she appeared at the Chichester Festival in the premiere of Richard Everett's comedy Entertaining Angels, which she later took on tour.

In 2007, she played the part of Lady Bracknell in The Importance of Being Earnest on tour, which transferred to the West End in 2008, at the Vaudeville Theatre. She has voiced adverts including ones for Pimm's, Lurpak, Tesco and most famously, The Parker Pen Company, which was named one of the 100 Greatest Adverts in a Channel 4 programme. In 2012, she starred in Keith Waterstone's Good Grief, having previously appeared in the play's premier production in 1998.

In 1997, she starred in the radio adaptations of To the Manor Born. In 2003, she appeared opposite June Brown in the television film Margery and Gladys. In 2007, she starred in a one-off To the Manor Born Christmas Special, Keith also voiced The Bear with Brown Fuzzy Hair in Teletubbies.

In 2009 she presented Penelope Keith and the Fast Lady, a one-off documentary for BBC Four about Dorothy Levitt, the Edwardian motoring pioneer. She presented the four-part BBC documentary The Manor Reborn in 2011.

Since 2014, she has presented all three series of the More4/Channel 4 programme Penelope Keith's Hidden Villages and in June 2016 she presented Penelope Keith at Her Majesty's Service again for Channel 4. In December 2017, she presented Penelope Keith's Coastal Villages, a continuation of the Hidden Villages series.

In early 2018, she presented the Channel 4 series Village of the Year with Penelope Keith. It was announced in February 2018 that Keith would be starring as Mrs St Maugham in the Chichester Festival Theatre production of Enid Bagnold's The Chalk Garden from 25 May to 16 June 2018.

Personal life
In 1978, the year The Good Life ended, she married Rodney Timson, a policeman. They had met while he was on duty at Chichester Theatre where Keith was performing. In 1988, ten years after their wedding, they adopted two boys, who were brothers. Keith and Timson now live in Milford, Surrey. Keith has a great passion for gardening. In 1984, she had a rose named after her. She is president of the South West Surrey chapter of the National Trust. In 2014, she presented 4 Extra Goes Gardening in which she celebrated the work of garden designer Gertrude Jekyll at her former home, Munstead Woods in Godalming. It is occasionally repeated on BBC Radio 4 Extra. Keith has been President of the Actors' Benevolent Fund since 1990, taking over after the death of Lord Olivier. She was a Trustee of Brooklands Museum from 2009 to 2018.

Filmography

Awards and honours
On 2 April 2002, her 62nd birthday, Keith began a one-year term as High Sheriff of Surrey, the third woman to hold the post. She has also served in the past as a Deputy Lieutenant of Surrey.

Keith was appointed an Officer of the Order of the British Empire (OBE) in the 1989 New Year Honours. She was awarded a Commander of the British Empire (CBE) in the 2007 New Year Honours for "charitable services". In the 2014 New Year Honours, she was made a Dame Commander of the Order of the British Empire (DBE) for services to the Arts and to Charity.

References

External links

1940 births
Living people
Actresses awarded damehoods
Alumni of the Webber Douglas Academy of Dramatic Art
Best Actress BAFTA Award (television) winners
Best Entertainment Performance BAFTA Award (television) winners
Dames Commander of the Order of the British Empire
Deputy Lieutenants of Surrey
English film actresses
English radio actresses
English stage actresses
English television actresses
High Sheriffs of Surrey
Laurence Olivier Award winners
People from Sutton, London
Royal Shakespeare Company members
20th-century English actresses
21st-century English actresses
British comedy actresses
British monarchists